Pantao Ragat, officially the Municipality of Pantao Ragat (Maranao: Inged a Pantao Ragat;), is a 4th class municipality in the province of Lanao del Norte, Philippines. According to the 2020 census, it has a population of 30,247 people.

Pantao Ragat is the mother town of Matungao and Poona Piagapo.

Geography

Barangays
Pantao Ragat is politically subdivided into 20 barangays.

Climate

Demographics

Economy

References

External links

 Pantao Ragat Profile at the DTI Cities and Municipalities Competitive Index
 [ Philippine Standard Geographic Code]
Philippine Census Information
Local Governance Performance Management System

Municipalities of Lanao del Norte